Clarence Frederick Lea (July 11, 1874 – June 20, 1964) was an American lawyer and politician who served 16 terms as a U.S. Representative from California from 1917 to 1949.

Biography
Lea was born near Highland Springs, California, in southwestern Lake County on July 11, 1874. He attended Lakeport Academy in Lakeport and Stanford University before obtaining a law degree from the University of Denver in 1898. Lea was admitted to the bar the same year and began practicing in Santa Rosa, California. He served as district attorney of Sonoma County, 1907–1917, and as president of the District Attorney's Association of California in 1916 and 1917.

Congress 
He was elected as a Democrat to the 65th U.S. Congress and to the 15 succeeding Congresses (March 4, 1917 – January 3, 1949). Lea served as chairman of the Committee on Interstate and Foreign Commerce (75th through 79th Congresses). After Congress, Lea engaged in public relations work in Washington, D.C. from 1949 to 1954.

Death
Lea died in Santa Rosa, California on June 20, 1964. He is interred at Franklin Avenue Odd Fellows Cemetery.

Legacy
Lea is known for having led the group of congressmen who passed the resolution calling for the internment of Italian-Americans, Japanese-Americans and German-Americans during World War II.

References

External links
 

1874 births
1964 deaths
Democratic Party members of the United States House of Representatives from California
Stanford University alumni
University of Denver alumni
People from Lake County, California